Universal Music Australia Pty Ltd. (UMA) is the largest Australian music corporation. It is a division of the Universal Music Group. Universal Music Australia's corporate headquarters are located in Sydney, Australia.

Labels

Universal Music Australia operates local record labels, as well distribution deals with independent Australian labels. UMA also represents all Universal Music Group's international labels within Australia.

Australian labels include:
Casablanca Records Australia
Caroline Records
Dew Process
EMI Music Australia
Island Records Australia

International labels include:

Capitol Music Group
 Co-Op Records
Def Jam
Fiction Records
Geffen Records
Interscope-Geffen-A&M
Island Records
MCA Nashville
PM:AM
Polydor Records
Republic Records
Virgin Records

Current and former Australian artists

Island Records Australia
Adam Eckersley Band
Andy Bull
Boy & Bear
The Cairos
Chance Waters
Clare Bowditch
Dean Lewis
Emma Birdsall
Gin Wigmore
Havana Brown
Jinja Safari
Marvin Priest
Masketta Fall
The McClymonts
Neda
Peta & The Wolves
Redcoats
Sinead Burgess
The Son
Tim Hart
Tom Lark
Vera Blue
Winterbourne

Golden Era Records
Hilltop Hoods

Mercury Records Australia
Adam Martin
Anja Nissen
Cat Torres
Celia Pavey
Emma Pask
Fatai
Harrison Craig
Karise Eden
Lakyn Heperi
Luke Kennedy
Matt Corby
Megan Washington
Melanie Dyer
Ms Murphy
Penelope Austin
The Preatures
Rachael Leahcar
Shannon Noll
Spiderbait

Modular Recordings
Architecture in Helsinki
Bag Raiders
Beni
Canyons
Cut Copy
Jonathan Boulet
Julian Hamilton
Kim Moyes
Ladyhawke
Muscles
Pond
The Presets
Sneaky Sound System
Tame Impala
Van She

Neon Records
Thandi Phoenix
Alfie Arcuri
Ivan Gough
Jebu
Walden
Zoe Badwi

Of Leisure
Muto
Jack Grace
Young Franco
Human Movement

Sony Music Australia
So Fresh (Corperation [sic?] albums)
Hits For Kids Pop Party

Universal Music Australia
Diana Rouvas
Grinspoon
Icehouse (Regular/dIVA)
Joe Moore
Phrase

Dew Process
Art of Sleeping
Bernard Fanning
Bluejuice
Expatriate
Gosling
The Grates
Guineafowl
Jae Laffer
Jebediah
The John Steel Singers
Last Dinosaurs
The Living End
The Panics
Sarah Blasko
Seeker Lover Keeper
Whitley

Capitol Records
5 Seconds of Summer
Alison Wonderland
Angus Stone
Birds of Tokyo
Birtles & Goble
Bob Evans
Crowded House
Empire of the Sun
Grey Ghost
King Cannons
Little River Band
Oh Mercy
Papa vs Pretty

EMI Music Australia
360
The Avalanches (Modular/Astralwerks/XL/EMI)
Crowded House
Johnny Farnham
Meg Mac
Middle Kids
Pez
Ricki-Lee
The Saints
Sam Bluer
Slim Dusty
Something for Kate
Tina Arena
Troye Sivan

Decca Records
Paulini

See also

List of record labels

References

External links
 Official website
 

Australian subsidiaries of foreign companies
Universal Music Group
Australian record labels
Record labels based in Sydney